Georgie John Donnelly (born 28 May 1988) is an English professional footballer who plays as a striker.

He has previously played for Skelmersdale United, Plymouth Argyle, Luton Town, Stockport County, Fleetwood Town, Macclesfield Town and Tranmere Rovers.

Donnelly has played internationally for England at non-league level.

Club career

Early career
As a youth player, Donnelly played for Liverpool. He started his career with Runcorn Town and Northern Premier League Division One North club Skelmersdale United, becoming a prolific goalscorer.

Plymouth Argyle
In March 2009 he joined Championship side Plymouth Argyle. Donnelly also had offers from Conference North clubs Southport and Fleetwood Town and Football League side Scunthorpe United. Donnelly made his debut for Plymouth on 18 April 2009 as a substitute in a 3–0 defeat at home against Doncaster Rovers in the Championship.

Luton Town loan
On 28 August 2009, Donnelly signed on a one-month loan for Conference Premier club Luton Town, where he made four substitute appearances.

Stockport County loans
He moved on loan to Stockport County on 29 January 2010, signing initially for one month. He made his debut for the club as second-half substitute on 30 January in a match against Southampton. His loan was later extended until the end of the season but he missed the last game of the season as his parent club Plymouth withdrew his loan. He scored 4 goals in the 19 games he played for the club.

In July 2010 he rejoined Stockport on loan for a further six months in a spell which saw him score 8 goals in 27 matches.

Fleetwood Town
On 6 January 2011 he moved to Fleetwood Town for a club record fee, believed to be in the region of £50,000. He made his debut for the club on 8 January.

In August 2011, George was the subject of speculation of an unusual bid from his former loan club Stockport County. Through the social networking site Twitter, County asked their fans who they would like to sign between Donnelly and Halifax Town forward Jamie Vardy. County director Tony Evans entered into negotiations with Fleetwood but valuations between the two clubs were irreparably different.

Macclesfield Town loans
Despite the Twitter interest, George signed for League Two club Macclesfield Town on an initial one-month loan on 9 September 2011.

Macclesfield Town
On 1 January 2012 he signed a two and half-year deal with Macclesfield Town after his loan period ended for an undisclosed five figure sum.

Rochdale
On 15 May 2012 it was announced that Donnelly had signed for Rochdale for an undisclosed fee on a two-year deal. He made his debut on 11 August in a 4–3 defeat against Barnsley in the League Cup. He scored his first goal for the club on 6 October in a 3–2 win against Accrington Stanley. He scored his second goal on 13 October in a 2–1 defeat at home to Morecambe.

Tranmere Rovers
On 1 September 2014, George joined Tranmere Rovers on a two-year deal for an undisclosed fee from Rochdale. Donnelly's contract was cancelled by mutual consent in July 2015.

AFC Liverpool
In August 2016 he joined AFC Liverpool.

Marine
In March 2018 he signed for Marine.

Personal life
Before turning professional as a footballer, Donnelly worked in a warehouse.

He is also a personal trainer.

References

External links

1988 births
Living people
People from Kirkby
English footballers
England semi-pro international footballers
Association football forwards
Liverpool F.C. players
Skelmersdale United F.C. players
Plymouth Argyle F.C. players
Luton Town F.C. players
Stockport County F.C. players
Fleetwood Town F.C. players
Macclesfield Town F.C. players
Rochdale A.F.C. players
English Football League players
National League (English football) players
Tranmere Rovers F.C. players
Southport F.C. players
A.F.C. Liverpool players
Runcorn Town F.C. players
Marine F.C. players
North West Counties Football League players